St. Ann Cathedral (also called Uruguaiana Cathedral) is a Catholic church that originated as the parish of Santana, created by Provincial Law 58 of May 29, 1846, together with the city of Uruguaiana, Brazil, and was built between 1861 and 1874.

In 1906, the parish was partially destroyed by a major fire, but was restored in the following years.

With the creation of the Diocese of Uruguaiana, on August 15, 1910, by the bull  by Pope Pius X, the parish became the Sant'ana Cathedral.

Later, in 1926, it was demolished since there was already a project for the construction of a bigger building, which was under construction; it was finished in 1959. It took 33 years to complete.

See also
Roman Catholicism in Brazil
St. Ann Cathedral

References

Roman Catholic cathedrals in Rio Grande do Sul
Roman Catholic churches completed in 1959
20th-century Roman Catholic church buildings in Brazil